Cornus disciflora is a species of flowering plant native to Mexico and Central America.

Description
Cornus disciflora is a small to a large tree, growing from 6 to 25 meters tall. It flowers from January to July and September to December, and fruits in March and April and from June to November.

Range and habitat
Cornus disciflora is distributed throughout the mountains of Mexico and Central America, where it is found in the Sierra Madre Occidental, Sierra Madre Oriental, Trans-Mexican Volcanic Belt, Sierra Madre del Sur, and Chiapas Highlands of Mexico, the Sierra Madre de Chiapas of Mexico and Guatemala, the Chortis Highlands of El Salvador, Honduras, and northern Nicaragua, and the Cordillera de Talamanca of Costa Rica and western Panama.

It is generally found in humid forests, including montane and premontane cloud forests and oak forests, and in wet areas of subhumid montane forests, between 1,000 and 2,900 meters elevation.

The fruits are an important food source for birds.

References

Trees of Mexico
Trees of Central America
Flora of the Sierra Madre Occidental
Flora of the Sierra Madre Oriental
Flora of the Sierra Madre de Oaxaca
Flora of the Trans-Mexican Volcanic Belt
Flora of the Chiapas Highlands
Cloud forest flora of Mexico
Flora of the Central American pine–oak forests
Flora of the Central American montane forests
Sierra Madre de Chiapas
Plants described in 1830
discifl